Captain Turner may refer to:

Characters
Naomi Turner's father in Elena of Avalor
Will Turner in Pirates of the Caribbean (film series)

People
Glenn Turner (cricketer) (born 1947), captain of New Zealand cricket team
Harry Turner (American football) (died 1914), captain of American football team
Isaac Turner
Norman Turner
William Thomas Turner (1856–1933), captain of RMS Lusitania